Alexis Jolly (born 22 December 1990) is a French businessman and politician who has represented the 6th constituency of the Isère department in the National Assembly since 2022. He is a member of the National Rally (RN).

Biography
Jolly was born in 1990. He is the co-founder and manager of a business selling and renting mountaineering and camping equipment. He joined the National Rally (then National Front) at age 18.

He was elected as a municipal councillor in Échirolles in 2014 and as a regional councillor in Auvergne-Rhône-Alpes in 2015. As a municipal councillor of Échirolles, he sat as a metropolitan councillor of Grenoble-Alpes Métropole from 2014 until his resignation from the municipal council in 2022.

Ahead of the 2022 legislative election, Jolly, the party leader in Isère, was selected by the National Rally to contest its 6th constituency. His campaign messages included cutting VAT tax on energy bills and restoring purchasing power for French citizens. He was elected to the constituency, defeating outgoing La République En Marche! representative Cendra Motin. He became the first Member of Parliament elected for the National Rally in Isère since Bruno Mégret in 1986. In Parliament, Jolly sits on the Foreign Affairs Committee.

Notes

References

1990 births
Living people
National Rally (France) politicians
21st-century French politicians
Deputies of the 16th National Assembly of the French Fifth Republic
Regional councillors of Auvergne-Rhône-Alpes
People from Besançon